The Vereinsgewehr 1857 (union rifle, mod. 1857) was the commonly developed rifle of Baden, Hesse and Württemberg for their troops of the 8th Bundesarmee corps as a successor of the Musket Model 1777 corrigé. The rifle for the line infantry was, with minor modifications in the sights, adopted by all three states; pistols and carbines for the cavalry and sharpshooter rifles for the Jäger were, however, developed by each state on its own.

The rifle has a percussion lock construction of Swiss model, i.e. there was no loading position of the hammer.

A number were converted to the Dreyse needle fire breech-loading bolt-action system in 1867, and became known as Model 1857/67.

Hesse and Baden/Württemberg variants 
Rifles from Hesse on the one hand and Baden and Württemberg on the other hand can be distinguished by their rear sights.

Hesse instead used a quadrant sight with the scale above, max. , after Darmstadt armoury colonel Müller.

Literature 
 Hans-Dieter Götz: Militärgewehre und Pistolen der deutschen Staaten 1800–1870, 2nd edition, Stuttgart, 1996,

External links 
 Vereinsgewehr-replica by Davide Pedersoli

Rifled muskets
Military of Württemberg
Rifles of Germany